

S

Sa 

 	

	

 

Saamite (seidozerite, lamprophyllite: IMA2013-083) 9.BE.25  [no] [no]
Sabatierite (IMA1976-043) 2.BD.45    (IUPAC: hexacopper thallium tetraselenide)
Sabelliite (IMA1994-013) 8.BE.65    (IUPAC: dicopper zinc trihydro arsenate)
Sabieite (sabieite: IMA1982-088) 7.AC.20    (IUPAC: ammonium iron(III) disulfate)
Sabinaite (IMA1978-071) 5.BB.20    (IUPAC: tetrasodium titanium dizirconium tetraoxide tetracarbonate)
Sabugalite (Y: 1951) 8.EB.55    (IUPAC: hydrogen aluminium tetrauranyl tetraphosphate hexadecahydrate)
Saccoite (IMA2019-056) 7.0  [no] [no]
Sacrofanite (cancrinite-sodalite: IMA1979-058) 9.FB.05   
Sadanagaite [Ca-amphibole: IMA2012 s.p., magnesiosadanagaite (IMA2002-051), 1984] 9.DE.15   
Saddlebackite (tetradymite: IMA1994-051) 2.GC.40d    (IUPAC: dilead dibismuth ditelluride trisulfide)
Safflorite (löllingite: 1835) 2.EB.15a    (IUPAC: cobalt diarsenide)
Sahamalite-(Ce) (IMA1987 s.p., 1953) 5.AD.05    (IUPAC: dicerium magnesium tetracarbonate)
Sahlinite (Y: 1934) 8.BO.20    (IUPAC: tetradecalead tetrachloro nonaoxodiarsenate)
Sailaufite (arseniosiderite: IMA2000-005) 8.DH.30   [no]
Sainfeldite (hureaulite: IMA1963-018) 8.CB.10    (IUPAC: pentacalcium diarsenate dihydroxoarsenate tetrahydrate)
Sakhaite (IMA1965-035) 6.AB.65   
Sakuraiite (stannite: IMA1965-017) 2.CB.05b    (IUPAC: tri(copper, zinc, iron) (indium, tin) tetrasulfide)
Salammoniac (IMA2007 s.p., 1556) 3.AA.25    (IUPAC: ammonium chloride)
Saléeite (Y: 1932) 8.EB.05    (IUPAC: magnesium diuranyl diphosphate deca(water))
Salesite (Y: 1939) 4.KB.05    (IUPAC: copper hydro iodate)
Saliotite (corrensite: IMA1990-018) 9.EC.60   [no] Note: a regular 1:1 ordered interstratification of cookeite and paragonite.
Saltonseaite (rinneite: IMA2011-104) 3.0  [no] [no] (IUPAC: tripotassium sodium manganese hexachloride)
Salzburgite (meneghinite: IMA2000-044) 2.HB.05a   
Samaniite (IMA2007-038) 2.BB.    (IUPAC: dicopper pentairon dinickel octasulfide)
Samarskite 4.DB.25
Samarskite-(Y) (IMA1980 s.p., 1847) 4.DB.25   
Samarskite-(Yb) (IMA2004-001) 4.DB.25   [no] (IUPAC: ytterbium niobium tetraoxide)
Samfowlerite (IMA1991-045) 9.BF.10   
Sampleite (lavendulan: 1942) 8.DG.05    (IUPAC: sodium calcium pentacopper chloride tetraphosphate pentahydrate)
Samraite (IMA2021-029) 8.FA.  [no] [no]
Samsonite (Y: 1910) 2.GA.15    (IUPAC: tetrasilver manganese diantimony hexasulfide)
Samuelsonite (IMA1974-026) 8.BF.10    (IUPAC: nonacalcium tetramanganese(II) dialuminium dihydroxide decaphosphate)
Sanbornite (Y: 1932) 9.EF.10    (IUPAC: dibarium (decaoxy tetrasilicate))
Sanderite (Y: 1952) 7.CB.07   [no] (IUPAC: magnesium sulfate dihydrate)
Saneroite (IMA1979-060) 9.DK.15   
Sangenaroite (IMA2019-014) 2.0  [no] [no]
Sanguite (IMA2013-002) 3.0  [no] [no](IUPAC: potassium copper trichloride)
Sanidine (feldspar: 1808) 9.FA.30    (IUPAC: potassium (aluminoctaoxotrisilicate))
Sanjuanite (sanjuanite-destinezite: IMA1966-043) 8.DB.30    (IUPAC: dialuminium hydroxide phosphate sulfate nonahydrate)
Sanmartinite (wolframite: 1948) 4.DB.30    (IUPAC: zinc (tungsten tetraoxide))
Sanrománite (IMA2006-009) 5.AC.30   [no] (IUPAC: disodium calcium trilead pentacarbonate)
Santabarbaraite (IMA2000-052) 8.CE.80   [no] (IUPAC: triiron(III) trihydro diphosphate pentahydrate)
Santaclaraite (IMA1979-005) 9.DK.10    (IUPAC: calcium tetramanganese(II) tetradecaoxopentasilicate dihydroxide monohydrate)
Santafeite (hydrous vanadate: 1958) 8.DM.40   
Santanaite (IMA1971-035) 7.FB.10    (IUPAC: undecalead chromium hexadecaoxide)
Santarosaite (IMA2007-013) 6.BD.05    (IUPAC: copper metaborate)
Santite (IMA1969-044) 6.EA.10    (IUPAC: potassium tetrahydroxide hexaoxopentaborate dihydrate)
Saponite (montmorillonite, smectite: 1842) 9.EC.45   
Sapozhnikovite (sodalite: IMA2021-030) 9.FB.  [no] [no]
Sapphirine (sapphirine: 1819) 9.DH.45   
Sarabauite (IMA1976-035) 2.MA.10    (IUPAC: hexasulfa tetraantimonide · calcium decaoxide hexaantimonide)
Saranchianite (IMA2015-019) 7.0  [no] [no] (IUPAC: disodium copper disulfate)
Sarcolite (Y: 1807) 9.EH.15   
Sarcopside (olivine: 1868) 8.AB.15    (IUPAC: triiron(II) diphosphate)
Sardignaite (IMA2008-040) 4.0  [no] [no] (IUPAC: bismuth dimolybdenum hydroheptaoxide dihydrate)
Sarkinite (wagnerite: 1884) 8.BB.15    (IUPAC: dimanganese(II) hydroxide arsenate)
Sarmientite (sanjuanite-destinezite: 1941) 8.DB.35    (IUPAC: diron(III) hydroxide arsenate sulfate pentahydrate)
Sarrabusite (selenite: IMA1997-046a) 4.0  [no]  (IUPAC: pentalead copper tetrachloro tetraselenite)
Sarrochite (IMA2021-116) 8.DM.  [no] [no]
Sartorite (sartorite: 1868) 2.HC.05a    (IUPAC: palladium diarsenic tetrasulfide)
Saryarkite-(Y) (IMA1987 s.p., 1964) 8.DO.25   
Sasaite (IMA1977-033) 8.DB.55    (IUPAC: hexaaluminium trihydro pentaphosphate hexatricontahydrate)
Sassolite (Y: 1778) 6.AA.05    (IUPAC: boric acid)
Satimolite (IMA1967-023) 6.HA.15    (IUPAC: potassium disodium tetraaluminium trichloro tri(pentaoxodiborate) tridecahydrate)
SatpaeviteQ (Y: 1959) 4.HG.65   
Satterlyite (IMA1976-056) 8.BB.20   
Sauconite (saponite, smectite: 1875) 9.EC.45   
Savelievaite (ludwigite: IMA2021-051) 6.AB.  [no] [no]
Sayrite (IMA1982-050) 4.GB.50    (IUPAC: dilead pentauranyl dihydro hexaoxide tetrahydrate)
Sazhinite 9.EA.30 (IUPAC: trisodium REE pentadecaoxyhexasilicate dihydrate)
Sazhinite-(Ce) (IMA1973-060) 9.EA.30   
Sazhinite-(La) (IMA2002-042a) 9.EA.30   [no]
Sazykinaite-(Y) (IMA1992-031) 9.DM.10   [no] (IUPAC: pentasodium yttrium zirconium octadecaoxyhexasilicate hexahydrate)

Sb – Se 
Sbacchiite (IMA2017-097) 3.CB.55  [no] [no]
Sborgite (Y: 1957) 6.EA.05    (IUPAC: sodium tetrahydroxide hexaoxopentaborate trihydrate)
Scacchite (Y: 1855) 3.AB.20    (IUPAC: manganese dichloride)
Scainiite (IMA1996-014) 2.JB.35b   
Scandio-winchite (sodium-calcium amphibole: IMA2022-009) 9.DE.  [no] [no]
Scandiobabingtonite (rhodonite: IMA1993-012) 9.DK.05   [no]
Scarbroite (Y: 1829) 5.DA.35    (IUPAC: pentaluminium tridecahydroxide carbonate pentahydrate)
Scawtite (Y: 1930) 9.CK.15    (IUPAC: heptacalcium di(nonaoxotrisilicate) carbonate dihydrate)
Scenicite (IMA2021-057) 7.EA.  [no] [no]
Schachnerite (amalgam: IMA1971-055) 1.AD.15a   
Schafarzikite (trippkeite: 1921) 4.JA.20    (IUPAC: iron(II) diantimony(III) tetraoxide)
Schäferite (garnet: IMA1997-048) 8.AC.25   [no] (IUPAC: sodium dicalcium dimagnesium trivanadate)
Schairerite (Y: 1931) 07.BD.10    (IUPAC: henicosasodium chloride hexafluoride heptasulfate)
Schallerite (pyrosmalite: 1925) 9.EE.15   
Schapbachite (galena, rocksalt: IMA1982 s.p., 1853 Rd) 02.JA.15   [no]
Schaurteite (fleischerite: 1988 s.p., 1967) 7.DF.25    (IUPAC: tricalcium germanium(IV) hexahydroxide disulfate trihydrate)
Scheelite (scheelite: 1821) 7.GA.05    (IUPAC: calcium tungstate)
Schertelite (Y: 1887) 8.CH.30    (IUPAC: diammonium magnesium dihydrogen diphosphate tetrahydrate)
Scheuchzerite (IMA2004-044) 9.DM.35   [no]
Schiavinatoite (zircon: IMA1999-051) 6.AC.15    (IUPAC: niobium tetraoxoborate)
Schieffelinite (lead-tellurium oxysalt: IMA1979-043) 7.CD.55   
Schindlerite (decavanadate: IMA2012-063) 4.0  [no] 
Schizolite (pectolite: IMA2018-B, IMA2013-067, 1901) 9.0  [no] [no] (IUPAC: sodium calcium manganese octaoxo trisilicate hydroxide)
Schlegelite (IMA2003-051) 8.BO.45   [no] (IUPAC: heptabismuth tetraoxo dimolybdate triarsenate)
Schlemaite (IMA2003-026) 2.BE.25   
Schlossmacherite (alunite, alunite: IMA1979-028 Rd) 7.BC.10    (IUPAC: hydronium trialuminium hexahydroxide disulfate)
Schlüterite-(Y) (epidote: IMA2012-015) 9.B?.  [no] [no]
Schmidite (schoonerite, calcioferrite: IMA2017-012) 8.0  [no] [no]
Schmiederite (linarite: 1963) 7.BC.65    (IUPAC: dicopper dilead tetrahydroxide selenite selenate)
Schmitterite (uranyl tellurite: IMA1967-045) 4.JK.70    (IUPAC: uranyl tellurite)
Schneebergite (tsumcorite: IMA1999-027) 8.CG.15    (IUPAC: bismuth dicobalt hydroxide diarsenate monohydrate)
Schneiderhöhnite (IMA1973-046) 4.JA.35    (IUPAC: iron(II) triiron(III) pentarsenic(III) tridecaoxide)
Schoderite (IMA1962 s.p.) 8.CE.70    (IUPAC: dialuminium phosphate vanadate octahydrate)
Schoenfliesite (schoenfliesite: IMA1968-008) 4.FC.10    (IUPAC: magnesium tin hexahydroxide)
Schoepite (IMA1962 s.p., 1923) 4.GA.05    (IUPAC: octauranyl dioxo dodecahydroxide dodecahydrate)
Schöllhornite (IMA1984-043) 2.FB.05    
Scholzite (Y: 1948) 8.CA.45    (IUPAC: calcium dizinc diphosphate dihydrate)
Schoonerite (schoonerite, calcioferrite: IMA1976-021) 8.DB.15    (IUPAC: zinc manganese(II) diiron(II) iron(III) dihydroxide triphosphate nonahydrate)
Schorl (tourmaline: IMA2007 s.p., 1505) 9.CK.05    (IUPAC: sodium triiron(II) hexaluminium octadecaoxohexasilicate triborate tetrahydroxide)
Schorlomite (garnet: 1846) 9.AD.25    (IUPAC: tricalcium dititanium diiron(III) silicate dodecaoxide)
Schreibersite (phosphide: 1848) 1.BD.05    (IUPAC: tri(iron, nickel) phosphide)
Schreyerite (schreyerite: IMA1976-004) 4.CB.35    (IUPAC: divanadium(III) trititanium(IV) nonaoxide)
Schröckingerite (Y: 1873) 5.EG.05    (IUPAC: sodium tricalcium uranyl fluoro sulfate tricarbonate decahydrate)
Schubnelite (IMA1970-015) 8.CB.35    (IUPAC: iron(III) tetraoxovanadate(V) monohydrate) 
Schuetteite (IMA1962 s.p., 1959) 7.BB.40    (IUPAC: trimercury dioxosulfate)
Schuilingite-(Nd) (IMA1987 s.p., 1948) 5.DB.20    (IUPAC: dicopper dipalladium dineodymium dihydro hexacarbonate trihydrate)
Schulenbergite (ktenasite: IMA1982-074) 7.DD.80    (IUPAC: hepta(copper, zinc) decahydroxide disulfate trihydrate)
Schüllerite (seidozerite, murmanite: IMA2010-035) 9.BE.25  [no] [no] (IUPAC: dibarium dititanium disodium dimagnesium di(heptaoxodisilicate) dioxodifluorine)
Schultenite (Y: 1926) 8.AD.30    (IUPAC: lead hydroxoarsenate)
Schumacherite (IMA1982-023) 8.BO.10    (IUPAC: tribismuth hydroxide oxide divanadate)
Schwartzembergite (Y: 1868) 4.KB.10    (IUPAC: pentalead(II) dihydrogen iodine(III) trichloride hexaoxide)
Schwertmannite (IMA1990-006) 7.DE.15   
Sclarite (IMA1988-026) 5.BA.30    (IUPAC: heptazinc decahydroxide dicarbonate)
Scolecite (zeolitic tectosilicate: IMA1997 s.p., 1813) 9.GA.05    (IUPAC: calcium dialuminotrisilicate decaoxo trihydrate)
Scordariite (IMA2019-010) 7.0  [no] [no]
Scorodite (Y: 1818) 8.CD.10    (IUPAC: iron(III) arsenate dihydrate)
Scorticoite (welinite: IMA2018-159) 9.0  [no] [no]
Scorzalite (lazulite: 1949) 8.BB.40    (IUPAC: iron(II) dialuminium dihydroxide diphosphate)
Scotlandite (IMA1982-001) 4.JE.20    (IUPAC: lead sulfite)
Scottyite (IMA2012-027) 9.0  [no] [no] (IUPAC: barium dicopper heptaoxodisilicate)
Scrutinyite (columbite: IMA1984-061) 4.DB.20    (IUPAC: α-lead dioxide)
Seaborgite (IMA019-087) 7.0  [no] [no]
Seamanite (Y: 1930) 6.AC.65    (IUPAC: trimanganese(II) tetrahydroborate dihydroxide phosphate)
Searlesite (Y: 1914) 9.EF.15    (IUPAC: sodium boron pentaoxy disilicate dihydroxide)
Sederholmite (nickeline: IMA1967 s.p., 1964) 2.CC.05    (IUPAC: β-nickel selenide)
Sedovite (IMA1968 s.p., 1965) 7.HA.05    (IUPAC: uranium(IV) dimolybdate)
Seeligerite (IMA1970-036) 4.KB.15    (IUPAC: trilead trichloro iodate)
Seelite (IMA1992-005) 4.JD.10    (IUPAC: magnesium diuranyl di(arsenite, arsenate) heptahydrate)
Segelerite (overite: IMA1973-023) 8.DH.20    (IUPAC: calcium magnesium iron(III) hydro diphosphate tetrahydrate)
Segerstromite (IMA2014-001) 8.0  [no] [no] (IUPAC: tricalcium diarsenate di[trihydro arsenite])
Segnitite (alunite, crandallite: IMA1991-017) 8.BL.10    (IUPAC: lead triiron(III) arsenate hexahydro hydroxoarsenate)
Seidite-(Ce) (IMA1993-029) 9.DJ.20   [no]
Seidozerite (seidozerite, rinkite: 1958) 9.BE.25    (IUPAC: disodium dizirconium disodium manganese titanium di(heptaoxodisilicate) dioxy difluoride)
Seifertite (IMA2004-010) 4.DA.50    (IUPAC: silicon dioxide)
Seinäjokite (löllingite: IMA1976-001) 2.EB.15b    (IUPAC: iron diantimonide)
Sejkoraite-(Y) (zippeite: IMA2009-008) 7.EC.15  [no] [no]
Sekaninaite (beryl: IMA1967-047) 9.CJ.10    (IUPAC: diiron(II) tetraluminium octadecaoxopentasilicate)
Selenium (element: 1828?) 1.CC.10   
Selenojalpaite (IMA2004-048) 2.BA.45    (IUPAC: trisilver copper diselenide)
Selenopolybasite (pearceite-polybasite: IMA2006-053) 2.GB.15   
Selenostephanite (IMA1982-028) 2.GB.10    (IUPAC: pentasilver antimony tetra(selenide, sulfide))
Seligmannite (Y: 1901) 2.GA.50    (IUPAC: copper lead trisulfa arsenide)
Selivanovaite (IMA2015-126) 9.B?.  [no] [no]
Sellaite (rutile: 1869) 3.AB.15    (IUPAC: magnesium difluoride)
Selwynite (IMA1993-037) 8.CA.20    (IUPAC: sodium potassium beryllium dizirconium tetraphosphate dihydrate)
Semenovite-(Ce) (IMA1971-036) 9.DN.10   
Semseyite (plagionite: 1881) 2.HC.10d   
Senaite (crichtonite: 1898) 4.CC.40   
Senandorite (lillianite: andorite VI, 1892) 2.JB.  [no]  
Senarmontite (IMA2015-E, 1851) 4.CB.50    (IUPAC: diantimony trioxide)
Senegalite (IMA1975-004) 8.DE.05    (IUPAC: dialuminium trihydroxide phosphate monohydrate)
Sengierite (IMA2007 s.p., 1949) 4.HB.10    (IUPAC: dicopper diuranyl divanadate hexahydrate)
Senkevichite (IMA2004-017) 9.DG.75   [no] (IUPAC: caesium sodium potassium dicalcium titanium oxide octadecaoxyheptasilicate hydroxide)
Sepiolite (sepiolite: 1847) 9.EE.25   
Serandite (pectolite: IMA2015-E, 1931) 9.DG.05    (IUPAC: sodium dimanganese(II) octaoxotrisilicate hydroxide)
Serendibite (sapphirine: 1903) 9.DH.40   
Sergeevite (IMA1979-038) 5.DB.25   
Sergevanite (eudialyte: IMA2019-057) 9.C  [no] [no]
Sergeysmirnovite (IMA2021-033)  [no] [no]
Serpentine subgroup, kaolinite-serpentine group 09.ED.NN  [no] [no]
Serpierite (devilline: 1881) 7.DD.30    (IUPAC: calcium tetra(copper, zinc) hexahydroxide disulfate trihydrate)
Serrabrancaite (kieserite: IMA1998-006) 8.CB.05   [no] (IUPAC: manganese phosphate monohydrate)
Sewardite (carminite: IMA2001-054) 8.BH.30   [no] (IUPAC: calcium diiron(III) dihydroxide diarsenate)

Sh – Sr 
Shabaite-(Nd) (IMA1988-005) 5.EE.10    (IUPAC: calcium diniobium uranyl dihydroxide tetracarbonate hexahydrate)
Shabynite (IMA1979-075) 6.AB.55    (IUPAC: pentamagnesium pentahydroxide dichloro trioxoborate tetrahydrate)
Shadlunite (pentlandite: IMA1972-012) 2.BB.15    (IUPAC: octa(iron, copper) (lead, cadmium) octasulfide)
Shafranovskite (IMA1981-048) 9.EE.65   
Shagamite (magnetoplumbite: IMA2020-091) 4.0  [no] [no]
Shakhovite (IMA1980-069) 4.FB.05    (IUPAC: dimercurous dimercuric antimonite trihydroxide)
Shandite (Y: 1949) 2.BE.15    (IUPAC: trinickel dilead disulfide)
Shannonite (IMA1993-053) 5.BE.05    (IUPAC: dilead carbonate oxide)
Sharpite (Y: 1938) 5.EA.35    (IUPAC: calcium triuranyl tetracarbonate trihydrate)
Sharyginite (brownmillerite: IMA2017-014) 4.0  [no] [no] (IUPAC: tricalcium titanium diiron octaoxide)
Shasuite (IMA2021-020) 8.FA.  [no] [no]
Shattuckite (IMA1967 s.p., 1915 Rd) 9.DB.40    (IUPAC: pentacopper tetra(trioxosilicate) dihydroxide)
Shcherbakovite (batisite: 1954) 9.DH.20    (IUPAC: dipotassium sodium dititanium dioxide dodecaoxytetrasilicate)
Shcherbinaite (IMA1971-021) 4.HE.10    (IUPAC: divanadium(V) pentaoxide)
Shchurovskyite (IMA2013-078) 8.0  [no] [no] (IUPAC: dipotassium calcium hexacopper dioxide tetraarsenate)
Sheldrickite (IMA1996-019) 5.DC.15    (IUPAC: sodium tricalcium trifluoro dicarbonate monohydrate)
Shenzhuangite (chalcopyrite: IMA2017-018) 2.0  [no] [no] (IUPAC: nickel iron disulfide)
Sherwoodite (Y: 1958) 4.HC.15   
Shibkovite (milarite: IMA1997-018) 9.CM.05   [no] (IUPAC: dipotassium dicalcium trizinc triacontaoxydodecasilicate )
Shigaite (hydrotalcite: IMA1984-057) 7.DD.35   
Shijiangshanite (IMA2022-029) 9.DK.  [no] [no]
Shilovite (nitrate: IMA2014-016) 5.0  [no] [no] (IUPAC: copper tetraammonium dinitrate)
Shimazakiite (IMA2010-085a) 6.0  [no] [no] (IUPAC: dicalcium pentaoxodiborate)
Shimenite (chabournéite: IMA2019-069) 2.HD.  [no] [no]
Shinarumpite (IMA2021-105) 7.EB.I  [no] [no]
Shinkolobweite (IMA2016-095) 4.0  [no] [no]
Shirokshinite (mica: IMA2001-063) 9.EC.20   [no] (IUPAC: potassium (dimagnesium sodium) decaoxotetrasilicate difluoride)
Shirozulite (mica: IMA2001-045) 9.EC.20   [no] (IUPAC: potassium trimanganese(II) (aluminotrisilicate) decaoxy dihydroxide)
Shkatulkalite (seidozerite, lamprophyllite: IMA1993-058) 9.BE.50   [no] (IUPAC: decasodium manganese trititanium triniobium hexa(heptaoxodisilicate) dihydroxide fluorine dodecahydrate)
Shlykovite (IMA2008-062) 9.E?.    (IUPAC: potassium calcium [nonaoxyhydroxytetrasilicate] trihydrate)
Shomiokite-(Y) (IMA1990-015) 5.CC.20    (IUPAC: trisodium yttrium tricarbonate trihydrate)
Shortite (Y: 1939) 5.AC.25    (IUPAC: disodium dicalcium tricarbonate)
Shosanbetsuite (tin alloy: IMA2018-162) 1.0  [no] [no] (IUPAC: trisilver tin alloy)
Shuangfengite (IMA1993-018) 2.EA.20    (IUPAC: iridium ditelluride)
ShubnikoviteQ (Y: 1953) 8.DG.05    Note: it might be lavendulan, sampleite or zdenekite (Giester et al., 2007).
Shuiskite 
Shuiskite-(Cr) (IMA2019-117) 9.BG.   [no] [no]
Shuiskite-(Mg) (IMA1980-061) 9.BG.20    (IUPAC: dicalcium magnesium dichromium tetraoxosilicate heptaoxodisilicate dihydroxyl monohydrate)
Shulamitite (brownmillerite: IMA2011-016) 4.0  [no] [no] (IUPAC: tricalcium titanium iron(III) aluminium octaoxide)
Shumwayite (IMA2015-058) 7.0  [no] [no] (IUPAC: di[uranyl sulfate diwater] monohydrate)
Shuvalovite (IMA2014-057) 7.0  [no] [no] (IUPAC: dipotassium (dicalcium sodium) fluoro trisulfate)
Sibirskite (Y: 1962) 6.BC.20    (IUPAC: calcium hydro (hydrogen pentaoxodiborate))
Sicherite (IMA1997-051) 2.HD.55   [no] (IUPAC: thallium disilver hexasulfa tri(arsenide, antimonide))
Sicklerite (olivine: 1912) 8.AB.10    (IUPAC: lithium manganese(II) phosphate)
Siderazot (nitride: 1876) 1.BC.10    (IUPAC: pentairon dinitride)
Siderite (calcite: IMA1962 s.p., 1845) 5.AB.05    (IUPAC: iron(II) carbonate)
Sideronatrite (Y: 1878) 7.DF.20    (IUPAC: disodium iron(III) hydrogen disulfate trihydrate)
Siderophyllite (mica: IMA1998 s.p., 1881) 9.EC.20    (IUPAC: potassium diron(II) aluminum (dialuminodisilicate) decaoxy dihydroxide)
Siderotil (chalcanthite: IMA1963 s.p., IMA1962-006a Rd) 7.CB.20    (IUPAC: (iron(II),copper) sulfate pentahydrate)
Sidorenkite (bradleyite: IMA1978-013) 5.BF.10    (IUPAC: trisodium manganese phosphate carbonate)
Sidpietersite (thiosulphate: IMA1998-036) 7.JA.05    (IUPAC: tetralead(II) dioxide dihydroxide thiosulphate)
Sidwillite (IMA1983-089) 4.FJ.05    (IUPAC: molybdenum trioxide dihydrate)
Siegenite (spinel, linnaeite: 1850) 2.DA.05    (IUPAC: cobalt dinickel tetrasulfide)
Sieleckiite (IMA1987-023) 8.DF.25    (IUPAC: tricopper tetraaluminium dodecahydroxide diphosphate dihydrate)
Sigismundite (arrojadite: IMA22-C, IMA1994-033) 8.BF.05   
Sigloite (laueite, laueite: IMA1967 s.p., 1962) 8.DC.30    (IUPAC: iron(III) dialuminium trihydroxide diphosphate heptahydrate)
Siidraite (IMA2016-039) 3.0  [no] [no] (IUPAC: dilead copper trihydroxide triodide)
Silesiaite (kristiansenite: IMA2017-064) 9.B?.  [no] [no] (IUPAC: dicalcium iron(III) tin heptaoxodisilicate hydrohexaoxodisilicate)
Silhydrite (IMA1970-044) 4.FM.30    (IUPAC: tri(dioxosilicate) monohydrate)
Silicocarnotite (IMA2013-139) 8.0  [no] [no] (IUPAC: pentacalcium [phosphate tetraoxosilicate] phosphate)
Silicon (element: IMA1982-099) 1.CB.15   [no]
Silinaite (IMA1990-028) 9.EF.20    (IUPAC: sodium lithium pentaoxodisilicate dihydrate)
Sillénite (Y: 1943) 4.CB.70    (IUPAC: dodecabismuth silicon icosaoxide)
Sillimanite (Y: 1824) 9.AF.05    (IUPAC: dialuminopentaoxosilicate)
Silver (element: old) 1.AA.05   
Silvialite (scapolite: IMA1998-010) 9.FB.15   [no] (IUPAC: tetracalcium hexaaluminotetraicosaoxohexasilicate sulfate)
Simferite (olivine: IMA1989-016) 8.AB.10   
Simmonsite (double perovskite: IMA1997-045) 3.CB.15    (IUPAC: disodium lithium hexafluoroaluminate)
Simonellite (Y: 1919) 10.BA.45    (IUPAC: 1,1-dimethyl-1,2,3,4-tetrahydro-7-isopropyl phenanthrene)
Simonite (IMA1982-052) 2.GC.20    (IUPAC: thallium mercury hexasulfa triarsenide)
Simonkolleite (IMA1983-019) 3.DA.20    (IUPAC: pentazinc octahydroxide dichloride monohydrate)
Simplotite (Y: 1956) 4.HG.20    (IUPAC: calcium nonaoxotetravanadate(IV) pentahydrate)
Simpsonite (Y: 1938) 4.DC.10    (IUPAC: tetraluminium tritantalum hydro tridecaoxide)
Sincosite (Y: 1922) 8.CJ.65    (IUPAC: calcium di(oxovanadate) diphosphate tetrahydrate)
Sinhalite (olivine: 1952) 6.AC.05    (IUPAC: magnesium aluminium tetraoxoborate)
Sinjarite (IMA1979-041) 3.BB.25    (IUPAC: calcium dichloride dihydrate)
Sinkankasite (IMA1982-078) 8.DB.20    (IUPAC: dimanganese aluminium hydroxide di(hydrogenphosphate) hexahydrate)
Sinnerite (IMA1964-020) 2.GC.10   
Sinoite (IMA1967 s.p., 1964) 1.DB.10    (IUPAC: disilicon oxydinitride)
Sitinakite (IMA1989-051) 9.AG.30    (IUPAC: potassium disodium tetratitanium hydroxytridecaoxodisilicate tetrahydrate)
Siudaite (IMA2017-092) 9.0  [no] [no]
Siwaqaite (ettringite: IMA2018-150) 7.0  [no] [no]
Skaergaardite (alloy: IMA2003-049) 1.AG.45   [no] (IUPAC: palladium copper alloy)
Skinnerite (IMA1973-035) 2.GA.20    (IUPAC: tricopper antimony trisulfide)
Skippenite (tetradymite: IMA1986-033) 2.DC.05    (IUPAC: dibismuth diselenide telluride)
Sklodowskite (Y: 1924) 9.AK.10    (IUPAC: magnesium diuranyl di(hydroxytrioxosilicate) hexahydrate)
Skorpionite (IMA2005-010) 8.DO.45    (IUPAC: tricalcium dizinc dihydro diphosphate carbonate monohydrate)
Skutterudite (skutterudite: 1827) 2.EC.05    (IUPAC: cobalt triarsenide)
Slavíkite (IMA2008 s.p., 1882 Rd) 7.DF.30   
Slavkovite (IMA2004-038) 8.0    (IUPAC: tridecacopper hexarsenate tetrahydroxoarsenate tricosahydrate)
Slawsonite (IMA1967-026) 9.FA.50    (IUPAC: strontium dialuminoctaoxodisilicate)
Šlikite (IMA2018-120) 5.0  [no] [no] (IUPAC: dizinc magnesium dihydro dicarbonate tetrahydrate)
Sluzhenikinite (IMA2020-089) 2.0  [no] [no]
Slyudyankaite (sodalite: IMA2021-062a) 9.FB.  [no] [no]
Smamite (IMA2019-001) 8.0  [no] [no]
Smirnite (tellurite: IMA1982-104) 4.JK.40    (IUPAC: dibismuth(III) pentaoxotellurate(IV))
SmirnovskiteQ (Y: 1957) 8.CJ.45  [no] [no] Note: possibly brockite.
Smithite (Y: 1905) 2.GC.30    (IUPAC: silver arsenic disulfide)
Smithsonite (calcite: 1780) 5.AB.05    (IUPAC: zinc carbonate)
Smolyaninovite (Y: 1956) 8.CH.55    (IUPAC: tricobalt diiron(III) tetrarsenate undecahydrate)
Smrkovecite (atelestite: IMA1993-040) 8.BO.15    (IUPAC: dibismuth oxide hydroxide phosphate)
Smythite (Y: 1956) 2.CC.10    ( (x ≈ 0-0.3))
Sobolevite (seidozerite, murmanite: IMA1982-042) 9.BE.37   
Sobolevskite (nickeline: IMA1973-042) 2.CC.05    (IUPAC: palladium bismuthide)
Sodalite (sodalite: 1812) 9.FB.10    (IUPAC: tetrasodium (trialuminotrisilicate) dodecaoxy chlorine)
Soddyite (Y: 1922) 9.AK.05    (IUPAC: diuranyl tetraoxosilicate dihydrate)
Sofiite (selenite: IMA1987-028) 4.JG.15    (IUPAC: dizinc dichloro selenite)
Sogdianite (milarite: IMA1971 s.p., 1968) 9.CM.05    (IUPAC: potassium dizirconium trilithium triacontaoxydodecasilicate)
Söhngeite (söhngeite: IMA1965-022) 4.FC.05    (IUPAC: gallium trihydroxide)
Sokolovaite (mica: IMA2004-012) 9.EC.20   [no] (IUPAC: caesium dilithium aluminodecaoxytetrasilicate difluorine)
Solongoite (IMA1973-017) 6.CA.40    (IUPAC: dicalcium trihydrogen chloro tetraoxytriborate hydroxide)
Somersetite (IMA2017-024) 5.0  [no] [no] (IUPAC: octalead dioxo dihydro pentacarbonate)
Sonolite (humite: IMA1967 s.p., 1963) 9.AF.55    (IUPAC: nonamanganese(II) tetra(tetraoxosilicate) dihydroxide)
Sonoraite (tellurite: IMA1968-001) 4.JN.05    (IUPAC: iron(III) hydroxide tellurite monohydrate)
Sopcheite (IMA1980-101) 2.BC.55    (IUPAC: tetrasilver tripalladium tetratelluride)
Sorbyite (madocite: IMA1966-032) 2.LB.30   
Sørensenite (IMA1965-006) 9.DG.30    (IUPAC: tetrasodium diberyllium tin di(nonaoxotrisilicate) dihydrate)
Sorosite (tin alloy: IMA1994-047) 1.AC.15   
Sosedkoite (IMA1981-014) 4.DM.05    (IUPAC: pentapotassium dialuminium docosatantalum hexacontaoxide)
Součekite (IMA1976-017) 2.GA.50    (IUPAC: copper lead bismuth tri(sulfide, selenide))
Souzalite (Y: 1948) 8.DC.45    (IUPAC: trimagnesium tetraaluminium hexahydroxide tetraphosphate dihydrate)
SpadaiteQ (saponite, smectite: 1863) 9.EC.45   
Spaltiite (IMA2014-012) 2.0  [no] [no] (IUPAC: dithallium dicopper pentasulfa diarsenide)
Spangolite (Y: 1890) 7.DD.15    (IUPAC: hexacopper aluminium dodecahydro chloro sulfate trihydrate)
Spencerite (Y: 1916) 8.DA.40    (IUPAC: tetrazinc dihydro diphosphate trihydrate)
Sperrylite (pyrite: 1889) 2.EB.05a    (IUPAC: platinum diarsenide)
Spertiniite (hydroxide: IMA1980-033) 4.FD.05    (IUPAC: copper(II) hydroxide)
Spessartine (garnet, garnet: 1832) 9.AD.25    (IUPAC: trimanganese(II) dialuminium tri(tetraoxysilicate))
Sphaerobertrandite (IMA2003 s.p., 1957 Rd) 9.AE.50   [no] (IUPAC: triberyllium tetraoxosilicate dihydroxyl)
Sphaerobismoite (IMA1993-009) 4.CB.65    (IUPAC: dibismuth trioxide)
Sphalerite (sphalerite: IMA1980 s.p., 1847) 2.CB.05a    (IUPAC: zinc sulfide)
Spheniscidite (IMA1977-029) 8.DH.10    (IUPAC: ammonium diiron(III) hydro diphosphate dihydrate)
Spherocobaltite (IMA1962 s.p., 1877 Rd) 5.AB.05    (IUPAC: cobalt(II) carbonate)
Spinel (spinel, spinel: 1546?/ 1797) 4.BB.05    (IUPAC: magnesium dialuminium tetraoxide)
Spionkopite (IMA1978-023) 2.CA.05c    
Spiridonovite (IMA2018-136) 2.0  [no] [no]
Spiroffite (IMA1967 s.p., 1962) 4.JK.10    (IUPAC: dimanganese(II) octaoxotritellurite)
Spodumene (pyroxene: IMA1962 s.p., 1800) 9.DA.30    (IUPAC: lithium aluminium hexaoxodisilicate)
Spriggite (IMA2002-014) 4.GC.15   [no] (IUPAC: trilead hexauranyl dihydro octaoxide trihydrate)
Springcreekite (alunite, crandallite: IMA1998-048) 8.BL.10   [no] (IUPAC: barium trivanadium(III) phosphate hexahydro hydroxophosphate)
Spryite (argyrodite: IMA2015-116) 2.0  [no] [no]
Spurrite (spurrite-afwillite: 1908) 9.AH.15    (IUPAC: pentacalcium di(tetraoxosilicate) carbonate)
Srebrodolskite (brownmillerite: IMA1984-050) .AC.10    (IUPAC: dicalcium diiron(III) pentaoxide)
Šreinite (IMA2004-022) 8.ED.10   [no] (IUPAC: lead tetrauranyl tri(bismuth oxide) heptahydro diphosphate tetrahydrate)
Srilankite (columbite: IMA1982-056) 4.DB.25    (IUPAC: dititanium zirconium hexaoxide)

St – Sz 
Stalderite (routhierite: IMA1987-024) 2.GA.40   
Staněkite (wagnerite: IMA1994-045) 8.BB.15    (IUPAC: iron(III) manganese(II) oxyphosphate)
Stanfieldite (IMA1966-045) 8.AC.70    (IUPAC: tetracalcium pentamagnesium hexaphosphate)
Stangersite (IMA2019-092) 2.0  [no] [no] (IUPAC: tin germanium trisulfide)
Stanleyite (IMA1980-042) 7.DE.50    (IUPAC: vanadium(IV) oxosulfate hexahydrate)
Stannite (stannite: 1832) 2.CB.15a    (IUPAC: dicopper iron tetrasulfa stannide)
Stannoidite (IMA1968-004a) 2.CB.15c   
Stannopalladinite (tin alloy: 1947) 1.AG.25    (IUPAC: tri(palladium, copper) distannide)
Starkeyite (starkeyite: 1945) 7.CB.15    (IUPAC: magnesium sulfate tetrahydrate)
Staročeskéite (lillianite: IMA2016-101) 2.0  [no] [no]
Starovaite (IMA2011-085) 8.0  [no]  (IUPAC: potassium pentacopper oxytrivanadate)
Staurolite (Y: 1792) 9.AF.30    (IUPAC: diiron(II) nonaluminium tetrasilicate heptaoxy hydroxyl)
Stavelotite-(La) (IMA2004-014) 9.BE.87   
Steacyite (steacyite: IMA1981-E) 9.CH.10   
Steedeite (IMA2013-052) 9.0  [no]
Steenstrupine-(Ce) (IMA1987 s.p., 1882) 9.CK.20   
Stefanweissite (IMA2018-020) 4.0  [no] [no]
Steigerite (Y: 1935) 8.CE.65    (IUPAC: aluminium vanadate trihydrate)
Steinhardtite (iron: IMA2014-036) 1.0  [no] [no] (IUPAC: aluminium)
Steinmetzite (IMA2015-081) 8.0  [no] [no]
Steklite (sabieite: IMA2011-041) 7.0  [no]  (IUPAC: potassium aluminium disulfate)
Stellerite (zeolitic tectosilicate: IMA1997 s.p., 1909) 9.GE.15   
Stenhuggarite (IMA1966-037) 4.JB.35    (IUPAC: calcium iron antimony oxide di(arsenic trioxide))
Stenonite (IMA1967 s.p., 1962) 3.CG.05   
Stepanovite (oxalate: IMA1967 s.p., 1953) 10.AB.20   
Stephanite (Y: 1845) 2.GB.10    (IUPAC: pentasilver tetrasulfa antimonide)
Štĕpite (IMA2012-006) 8.0  [no] [no] (IUPAC: uranium(IV) di(hydroxoarsenate) tetrahydrate)
Stercorite (Y: 1850) 8.CJ.05    (IUPAC: sodium ammonium hydroxyphosphate tetrahydrate)
Sterlinghillite (IMA1980-007) 8.CD.25    (IUPAC: trimanganese(II) diarsenate tetrahydrate)
Sternbergite (cubanite: 1827) 2.CB.65    (IUPAC: silver diiron trisulfide)
Steropesite (IMA2008-014) 3.CK.05   [no] (IUPAC: trithallium bismuth hexachloride)
Sterryite (madocite: IMA1966-020) 2.LB.30   
StetefeldtiteQ (pyrochlore: IMA2013 s.p., IMA2010 s.p., 1867) 4.DH.20    Note: probably argentoroméite.
Stetindite-(Ce) (zircon: IMA2008-035) 9.AD.30  [no] [no]
Steudelite (cancrinite: IMA2021-007) 9.FB.  [no] [no]
StevensiteQ (saponite, smectite: 1873) 9.EC.45   
Steverustite (thiosulfate: IMA2008-021) 7.JA.10   [no]
Stewartite (stewartite, laueite: 1910) 8.DC.30    (IUPAC: manganese(II) diiron(III) dihydro diphosphate octahydrate)
Stibarsen (arsenic: IMA1982 s.p., 1941) 1.CA.05    (IUPAC: arsenic antimony alloy)
StibiconiteQ (pyrochlore: IMA2013 s.p., IMA2010 s.p., 1837) 4.DH.20    Note: might be a variety of roméite group.
Stibioclaudetite (claudetite: IMA2007-028) 4.CB.45   [no] (IUPAC: arsenic antimony trioxide)
Stibiocolumbite (cervantite: 1915) 4.DE.30    (IUPAC: antimony niobium tetraoxide)
Stibiocolusite (germanite: IMA1991-043) 2.CB.30   
Stibiogoldfieldite (tetrahedrite: IMA2020-104) 2.GB.  [no] [no] (IUPAC: hexacopper hexacopper (diantimonide ditelluride) tridecasulfide)
Stibiopalladinite (IMA1980 s.p., 1927) 2.AC.20a    (IUPAC: pentapalladium diantimonide)
Stibiotantalite (cervantite: 1893) 4.DE.30    (IUPAC: antimony(III) tantalum tetraoxide)
Stibioústalečite (IMA2021-071) 2.GB.  [no] [no]
Stibivanite (IMA1980-020) 4.JA.55    (IUPAC: diantimony(III) vanadium(IV) pentaoxide)
Stibnite (stibnite: 1832) 2.DB.05    (IUPAC: diantimony trisulfide)
Stichtite (hydrotalcite: 1910 Rd) 5.DA.50    (IUPAC: hexamagnesium dichromium hexadecahydro carbonate tetrahydrate)
Stilbite (zeolitic tectosilicate) 9.GE.10
Stilbite-Ca (IMA1997 s.p., 1801) 9.GE.10   
Stilbite-Na (IMA1997 s.p., 1997) 9.GE.10   [no]
Stilleite (sphalerite: 1956) 2.CB.05a    (IUPAC: zinc selenide)
Stillwaterite (stillwaterite: IMA1974-029) 2.AC.10a    (IUPAC: octapalladium triarsenide)
Stillwellite-(Ce) (IMA1987 s.p., 1955) 9.AJ.25    (IUPAC: cerium borosilicate pentaoxy)
Stilpnomelane (smectite: IMA1971 s.p., 1827) 9.EG.40   
Stishovite (IMA1967 s.p., 1962) 4.DA.40    (IUPAC: silicon dioxide)
Stistaite (metalloid alloy: IMA1969-039) 2.AA.45    (IUPAC: tin antimonide)
Stöfflerite (lingunite: IMA2017-062) 9.F?.  [no] [no] (IUPAC: calcium dialumodisilicate octaoxy)
Stoiberite (IMA1979-016) 8.BB.75    (IUPAC: pentacopper dioxo divanadate)
Stokesite (Y: 1900) 9.DM.05    (IUPAC: calcium stannotrisilicate nonaoxy dihydrate)
Stolperite (alloy: IMA2016-033) 1.0  [no] [no] (IUPAC: aluminium copper alloy)
Stolzite (scheelite: 1845) 7.GA.05    (IUPAC: lead tungstate)
Stoppaniite (beryl: IMA1996-008) 9.CJ.05   [no] (IUPAC: diiron(III) triberylohexasilicate octadecaoxy monohydrate)
Stornesite-(Y) (fillowite: IMA2005-040) 8.AC.50   [no]
Stottite (stottite: 1958) 4.FC.15    (IUPAC: iron(II) germanium(IV) hexahydroxide)
Straβmannite (leydetite: IMA2017-086) 9.0  [no] [no] (IUPAC: aluminium uranyl di(tetraoxy silicate) fluoride hexadecahydrate)
Stracherite (zadovite, arctite: IMA2016-098) 9.A?.  [no] [no] (IUPAC: barium hexacalcium di(tetraoxy silicate) di(phosphate carbonate) fluoride)
Straczekite (straczekite: IMA1983-028) 4.HE.20   
Strakhovite (IMA1993-005) 9.CF.20   [no]
Stranskiite (IMA1962 s.p.) 8.AB.35    (IUPAC: copper dizinc diarsenate)
Strashimirite (IMA1967-025) 8.DC.12    (IUPAC: octacopper tetrahydro tetrarsenate pentahydrate) (Sejkora et al., 2015)
Strätlingite (IMA1975-031) 9.EG.25   
Strelkinite (IMA1973-063) 4.HB.30    (IUPAC: disodium diuranyl divanadate hexahydrate)
Strengite (Y: 1877) 8.CD.10    (IUPAC: iron(III) phosphate dihydrate)
Stringhamite (IMA1974-007) 9.AE.35    (IUPAC: calcium copper (tetraoxy silicate) monohydrate)
Stromeyerite (Y: 1832) 2.BA.40    (IUPAC: copper silver sulfide)
Stronadelphite (apatite: IMA2008-009) 8.BN.05  [no] [no] (IUPAC: pentastrontium fluoro triphosphate)
Stronalsite IMA(1983-016) 9.FA.60    (IUPAC: disodium strontium tetraluminotetrasilicate hexadecaoxy)
Strontianite (aragonite: 1791) 5.AB.15    (IUPAC: strontium carbonate)
StrontiochevkiniteQ (chevkinite: IMA1983-009) 9.BE.70    (Note: it might be Fe-bearing rengeite)
Strontiodresserite (dundasite: IMA1977-005) 5.DB.10    (IUPAC: strontium dialuminium tetrahydro dicarbonate monohydrate)
Strontiofluorite (fluorite: IMA2009-014) 3.AB.25  [no]  (IUPAC: strontium difluoride)
Strontioginorite (Y: 1960) 6.FC.15    (IUPAC: calcium strontium hexahydro icosaoxo tetradecaborate pentahydrate)
Strontiohurlbutite (danburite: IMA2012-032) 8.AA.15 (9 ed)  [no] [no] (IUPAC: strontium diberyllium diphosphate)
Strontiojoaquinite (joaquinite: IMA1979-080 Rd) 9.CE.25   
Strontiomelane (hollandite, coronadite: IMA1995-005) 4.DK.05a    (IUPAC: strontium (hexamanganese(IV) dimanganese(III)) hexadecaoxide)
Strontio-orthojoaquinite (joaquinite: IMA2000-D, IMA1979-081a Rd) 9.CE.25    (IUPAC: sodium tetrastrontium iron(III) dititanium octasilicate tetraicosaoxy tetrahydroxyl)
Strontioperloffite (bjarebyite: IMA2015-023) 8.0  [no] [no] (IUPAC: strontium dimanganese(II) diiron(III) trihydro triphosphate)
Strontiopharmacosiderite (pharmacosiderite: IMA2013-101) 8.DK.  [no] [no] (IUPAC: strontium octairon (octahydro hexarsenate) octahydrate)
Strontioruizite (ruizite: IMA2017-045) 9.B?.  [no] [no] (IUPAC: distrontium dimanganese(III) tetrasilicate undecaoxy tetrahydroxyl dihydrate)
Strontiowhitlockite (whitlockite: IMA1989-040) 8.AC.45    (IUPAC: nonastrontium magnesium hexaphosphate hydroxophosphate)
Strunzite (strunzite: 1958) 8.DC.25    (IUPAC: manganese(II) diiron(III) dihydro diphosphate hexahydrate)
Struvite (struvite) 8.CH.40
Struvite (1847) 8.CH.40    (IUPAC: ammonium magnesium phosphate hexahydrate)
Struvite-K (IMA2003-048) 8.CH.40    (IUPAC: potassium magnesium phosphate hexahydrate)
Studenitsite (IMA1994-026) 6.GB.05   
Studtite (Y: 1947) 4.GA.15    (IUPAC: (uranyl dioxide diwater) dihydrate)
Stumpflite (nickeline: IMA1972-013) 2.CC.05    (IUPAC: platinum antimonide)
Sturmanite (ettringite: IMA1981-011) 7.DG.15   
Stützite (IMA1964 s.p., 1878 Rd) 2.BA.65    ( (x = 0.24-0.36))
Suanite (IMA1967 s.p., 1953) 6.BA.05    (IUPAC: dimagnesium pentaoxo diborate)
Sudburyite (nickeline: IMA1973-048) 2.CC.05    (IUPAC: palladium antimonide)
Sudoite (chlorite: IMA1966-027 Rd) 9.EC.55    (IUPAC: di magnesium trialuminium alumotrisilicate decaoxy octahydroxyl)
Sudovikovite (IMA1995-009) 2.EA.20   [no] (IUPAC: platinum diselenide)
Suenoite (Mg-Fe-Mn amphibole: IMA2019-075) 9.D  [no] [no]
Suessite (silicide: IMA1979-056) 1.BB.05    (IUPAC: triiron silicide)
Sugakiite (pentlandite: IMA2005-033) 2.BB.15   
Sugilite (milarite: IMA1974-060) 9.CM.05    (IUPAC: potassium disodium diiron(III) trilithiododecasilicate triacontaoxy)
Suhailite (mica: IMA2007-040) 9.EC.20   [no] (IUPAC: ammonium triiron(II) (alumotrisilicate) decaoxy dihydroxyl)
Sulfatoredmondite (IMA2021-089) 7.JA.  [no] [no]
Sulfhydrylbystrite (cancrinite: IMA2015-010) 9.F?.  [no] [no]
Sulfoborite (Y: 1893) 6.AC.55   
Sulphohalite (double antiperovskite: 1888) 7.BD.05    (IUPAC: hexasodium chloro fluoro disulfate) 
Sulphotsumoite (tetradymite: IMA1980-084) 2.DC.05    (IUPAC: tribismuth ditelluride sulfide)
Sulphur (element: old) 1.CC.05    (IUPAC: octasulfur rings, α-sulphur) (Note: sulfur per Wikipedia convention but the IMA names the native mineral sulphur) 
Sulphur-β (Y: 1912)  (IUPAC: octasulfur rings, β-sulfur)
Sulvanite (Y: 1900) 2.CB.70    (IUPAC: tricopper vanadium tetrasulfide)
Sundiusite (IMA1979-044) 7.BD.70    (IUPAC: decalead octaoxo dichloro sulfate)
Suolunite (IMA1968 s.p., 1965) 9.BE.10    (IUPAC: dicalcium disilicate pentaoxy dihydroxyl monohydrate)
Suredaite (IMA1997-043) 2.DB.10   [no] (IUPAC: lead antimonide trisulfide)
Surinamite (sapphirine: IMA1974-053) 9.DH.55    (IUPAC: trimagnesium trialuminium oxy (pentadecaoxy berylloalumotrisilicate))
Surite (IMA1977-037) 9.EC.75   
Sursassite (ardennite: 1926) 9.BG.15    (IUPAC: dimanganese(II) trialuminium (tetraoxo silicate) (heptaoxy disilicate) trihydroxyl)
Susannite (Y: 1845) 5.BF.40    (IUPAC: tetralead dihydro sulfate dicarbonate)
Suseinargiuite (scheelite: IMA2014-089) 7.0  [no] [no] (IUPAC: sodium bismuth dimolybdate)
Sussexite (Y: 1868) 6.BA.15    (IUPAC: manganese(II) hydro dioxo borate)
Suzukiite (IMA1978-005) 9.DH.15    (IUPAC: barium vanadium(IV) disilicate heptaoxy)
Svabite (apatite: 1892) 8.BN.05    (IUPAC: pentacalcium fluoro triarsenate)
Svanbergite (alunite, beudantite: IMA1987 s.p., 1854 Rd) 8.BL.05    (IUPAC: strontium trialuminium hexahydro sulfate phosphate)
Sveinbergeite (astrophyllite, devitoite: IMA2010-027) 9.DC.05  [no] 
Sveite (IMA1980-005) 5.ND.20    (IUPAC: potassium heptaluminium hexadecahydro dichloro tetranitrate octahydrate)
Švenekite (IMA1999-007) 8.AD.10   [no] (IUPAC: calcium di(dihydroxoarsenate))
Sverigeite (IMA1983-066) 9.AE.15    (IUPAC: sodium diberyllium dimanganese(II) tin trisilicate dodecaoxy hydroxyl)
Svornostite (IMA2014-078) 7.0  [no] [no] (IUPAC: dipotassium magnesium di[uranyl disulfate] octahydrate)
Svyatoslavite (IMA1988-012) 9.FA.45    (IUPAC: calcium (octaoxy dialumodisilicate))
Svyazhinite (IMA1983-045) 7.DB.05    (IUPAC: magnesium aluminium fluoro disulfate tetradecahydrate)
Swaknoite (IMA1991-021) 8.CJ.10    (IUPAC: diammonium calcium di(hydroxophosphate) monohydrate)
Swamboite-Nd (IMA2017-A, IMA1981-008) 9.AK.20    (IUPAC: niobium tri[uranyl silicate trioxy hydroxyl] (c. 7.5)hydrate)
Swartzite (Y: 1951) 5.ED.10    (IUPAC: calcium magnesium uranyl tricarbonate dodecahydrate)
Swedenborgite (Y: 1924) 4.AC.05    (IUPAC: sodium tetraberyllium antimony(V) heptaoxide)
Sweetite (IMA1983-011) 4.FA.10    (IUPAC: zinc dihydroxide)
Swinefordite (montmorillonite, smectite: IMA1973-054) 9.EC.45   
Switzerite (IMA1966-042 Rd) 8.CE.25    (IUPAC: trimanganese(II) diphosphate heptahydrate)
Sylvanite (calaverite: 1832) 2.EA.05    (IUPAC: silver gold tetratelluride)
Sylvite (halite, rocksalt: 1823) 3.AA.20    (IUPAC: potassium chloride)
Symesite (IMA1998-035) 3.DC.60    (IUPAC: decalead heptaoxo tetrachloro sulfate monohydrate)
Symplesite (symplesite: 1837) 8.CE.45    (IUPAC: triiron(II) diarsenate octahydrate)
Synadelphite (Y: 1884) 8.BE.50    (IUPAC: nonamanganese(II) nonahydro diarsenate arsenate(III) dihydrate)
Synchysite (synchysite) 5.BD.20c (IUPAC: calcium REE fluoro dicarbonate)
Synchysite-(Ce) (IMA1982-030) 5.BD.20c   
Synchysite-(Nd) (IMA1982-030a) 5.BD.20c   
Synchysite-(Y) (IMA1982-030b, 1955) 5.BD.20c   
Syngenite (Y: 1872) 7.CD.35    (IUPAC: dipotassium calcium disulfate monohydrate)
Szaibélyite (Y: 1862) 6.BA.15    (IUPAC: magnesium hydro dioxo borate)
Szenicsite (IMA1993-011) 7.GB.10    (IUPAC: tricopper tetrahydro molybdate)
Szklaryite (dumortierite: IMA2012-070) 4.0  [no] [no] (IUPAC: vacancy hexaluminium boron triarsenic(III) pentadecaoxide)
Szmikite (kieserite: 1877) 7.CB.05    (IUPAC: manganese(II) sulfate monohydrate)
Szomolnokite (kieserite: 1891) 7.CB.05    (IUPAC: iron(II) sulfate monohydrate)
SztrokayiteN (Y: 1987) 2.DC.05   [no] (IUPAC: tribismuth telluride disulfide)
Szymańskiite (IMA1989-045) 5.DB.30

External links
IMA Database of Mineral Properties/ RRUFF Project
Mindat.org - The Mineral Database
Webmineral.com
Mineralatlas.eu minerals S